Senator Corbin may refer to:

Kilmer B. Corbin (1919–1993), Texas State Senate
Philip Corbin (manufacturer) (1824–1910), Connecticut State Senate